The 2000 Fareham Council election took place on 4 May 2000 to elect members of Fareham Borough Council in Hampshire, England. One third of the council was up for election and the Conservative Party stayed in overall control of the council.

After the election, the composition of the council was:
Conservative 29
Liberal Democrat 11
Labour 2

Election result
The results saw the Conservatives increase their majority on the council after gaining 5 seats. The Labour Party lost all 3 of the seats they had been defending, while the other 2 Conservative gains came from the Liberal Democrats. 2 Liberal Democrat councillors were the only non Conservatives elected after holding Portchester Central and Stubbington wards. Turnout in the election varied between a high of 39.5% in Portchester East and a low of 21.9% in Fareham South.

Ward results

References

2000
2000 English local elections
2000s in Hampshire